Lists of ambassadors of Israel may refer to:

List of Israeli ambassadors
List of ambassadors of Israel to Albania
List of ambassadors of Israel to Angola
List of ambassadors of Israel to Antigua and Barbuda
List of Israeli ambassadors to Argentina
List of ambassadors of Israel to Armenia
List of ambassadors of Israel to Australia
List of ambassadors of Israel to Austria
List of Israeli ambassadors to Azerbaijan
List of ambassadors of Israel to the Bahamas
List of ambassadors of Israel to Bolivia
List of ambassadors of Israel to Bosnia and Herzegovina
List of ambassadors of Israel to Brazil
List of ambassadors of Israel to Canada
List of ambassadors of Israel to China
List of ambassadors of Israel to the Republic of Congo
List of ambassadors of Israel to Costa Rica
List of ambassadors of Israel to Croatia
List of ambassadors of Israel to Cuba
List of ambassadors of Israel to Cyprus
List of ambassadors of Israel to the Czech Republic
List of ambassadors of Israel to Denmark
List of ambassadors of Israel to Ecuador
List of Israeli ambassadors to Egypt
List of ambassadors of Israel to El Salvador
List of ambassadors of Israel to the European Union
List of ambassadors of Israel to Finland
List of Israeli ambassadors to France
List of Israeli ambassadors to Germany
List of ambassadors of Israel to Guatemala
List of ambassadors of Israel to the Holy See
List of ambassadors of Israel to Honduras
List of ambassadors of Israel to International Organizations
List of ambassadors of Israel to Ireland
List of ambassadors of Israel to Italy
List of ambassadors of Israel to Kyrgyzstan
List of ambassadors of Israel to Latvia
List of ambassadors of Israel to Lithuania
List of ambassadors of Israel to Nicaragua
List of ambassadors of Israel to Poland
List of ambassadors of Israel to Russia
List of ambassadors of Israel to Spain
List of ambassadors of Israel to Switzerland
List of ambassadors of Israel to Turkey
List of ambassadors of Israel to Ukraine
List of Israeli ambassadors to the United Kingdom
Permanent Representative of Israel to the United Nations
List of Israeli ambassadors to the United States
List of ambassadors of Israel to Uruguay
List of ambassadors of Israel to Zimbabwe

Lists of ambassadors by country of origin